The Haudenosaunee Nationals Indoor Lacrosse Team, known as the Haudenosaunee Nationals, represents the Iroquois Confederacy in international box lacrosse competitions.  They are currently ranked second in the world by World Lacrosse and have won Silver medals in all four World Indoor Lacrosse Championships. The team is organized by the First Nations Lacrosse Association.

In June of 2022, the Nationals dropped Iroquois from their name, adopting the name the Haudenosaunee Nationals.

World Indoor Lacrosse Championship

Overall results

2003
In the first World Indoor Lacrosse Championship, the Nationals only lost to Canada, but twice, a close 15–13 game in round-robin play and a blowout 21–4 loss in the championship. John Grant Jr. of Team Canada scored 7 goals and 2 assists in the final.

2007
The 2007 WILC final, with the expected pairing of Canada against the Nationals, was one of the best games in box lacrosse history. Team Canada went through the first quarter with a 4–2 lead, then the Nationals were able to come back in the second and third. The Iroquois were up 10-9 at the start of the fourth quarter. Three quick Canadian goals put them in front again, but they were answered by another three goals by the Nationals. Then John Grant, Jr. scored two goals and the victory for Canada was almost secured. But Dean Hill scored in the final minute of regulation to tie it at 14, sending the championship into overtime. Thirty seconds into overtime, Jeff Zywicki scored his first goal of the game, making it 15–14 for Canada's second gold medal.

2011
Canada beat the Nationals in the final for the third time in 2011. Starting goaltender Mike Thompson was injured in the second quarter and had to be replaced by Angus Goodleaf. Cody Jamieson and Sid Smith and were named to the All World Team. Roger Vyse lead the team in scoring with 15 goals and 9 assists.

2015
The 2015 World Indoor Lacrosse Championship was hosted by the Onondaga Nation, south of Syracuse, New York. Canada defeated the host Iroquois Nationals 12–8 in the gold medal game, the same finals match-up featured in all four indoor championships.

Most games were held on the Onondaga Reservation at the Onondaga Nation Arena and the newly built $6.5 million Onondaga Nation Fieldhouse, although the Iroquois' games versus Canada and the United States were held at War Memorial Arena in Syracuse and the gold and bronze medal games were held at the Carrier Dome.

The opening ceremonies in the sold-out War Memorial Arena featured a light show about the Haudenosaunee creation story and traditional dancing. The documentary Spirit Game: Pride of a Nation explains the meaning of lacrosse to the Iroquois people and covers the Iroquois Nationals in the 2015 WILC, featuring brothers Lyle and Miles Thompson.

2019

Awards

Other competitions

Bowhunters Cup

Heritage Cup

Junior teams
During the 2015 WILC, the first FIL sanctioned under–17 box lacrosse friendly took place between the Iroquois Nationals and Team Canada. The under-17 squads again faced off prior to the 2017 Heritage Cup.

Other tournaments and games

See also
First Nations Lacrosse Association
Iroquois men's national lacrosse team
Haudenosaunee women's national lacrosse team
World Indoor Lacrosse Championship

References

External links
Iroquois Nationals, 2015 WILC

Lacrosse of the Iroquois Confederacy
National lacrosse teams
National sports teams of the Iroquois Confederacy